The Speckled Band may refer to:

The Adventure of the Speckled Band, one of the 56 short Sherlock Holmes stories written by author Sir Arthur Conan Doyle
 The Speckled Band (1923 film), a silent film starring Eille Norwood as Sherlock Holmes
 The Speckled Band (1931 film), a film starring Raymond Massey as Sherlock Holmes
 The Speckled Band, a 1949 television adaptation for an episode of  Your Show Time
The Speckled Band (play), a 1910 stage play adapted by Arthur Conan Doyle from his own short story